Nujin is a city in the Central District of Farashband County, Fars Province, Iran.  At the 2006 census, its population was 3,356, in 772 families.

References

Populated places in Farashband County

Cities in Fars Province